Marie Heilbron (or Heilbronn,  – 31 March 1886) was a Belgian operatic coloratura soprano, particularly associated with the French repertory, creator of Jules Massenet's quintessential French heroine Manon.

Born in Antwerp, she studied first in Brussels and later in Paris with famous tenor Gilbert Duprez. She made her Parisian debut at the Théâtre-Italien in 1866, as Marie in La fille du régiment. In 1867, she appeared for the first time at the Opéra-Comique, as Catherine in L'étoile du nord. She was to create there Massenet's Manon in 1884. She also appeared at the Théâtre des Variétés from 1871 onwards. She took part in the creation of  Jacques Offenbach's Les braconniers, and Victor Massé's Une nuit de Cléopâtre.

In 1879, she made her debut at the Opéra Garnier, where she sang as Marguerite in Faust, Ophélie in Hamlet, Juliette in Roméo et Juliette. The same year she made her debut at La Scala in Milan, as Violetta in La traviata. She also appeared in Monte Carlo and St Petersburg.

Heilbron died at Nice, France in 1886.

Sources
 Le guide de l'opéra, Roland Mancini & Jean-Jacques Rouveroux, (Fayard, 1989) 

1851 births
1886 deaths
Belgian operatic sopranos
Musicians from Antwerp
19th-century Belgian women opera singers